Allports Island is a small uninhabited island located in Queen Charlotte Sound in Marlborough, New Zealand. An even smaller unnamed island lies immediately to the east of it. Both islands are covered in native bush.

See also

 List of islands of New Zealand
 List of islands
 Desert island

References

Uninhabited islands of New Zealand
Islands of the Marlborough Sounds